Geoff Roper (born 3 June 1964) is a Canadian former professional tennis player.

Roper was a collegiate tennis player for Florida State University and competed on the professional tour in the 1980s, reaching a best singles ranking of 437. He featured in the qualifying draw for the 1988 Wimbledon Championships and made the main draw of the 1988 Volvo International in Stratton Mountain.

ATP Challenger finals

Doubles: 1 (0–1)

References

External links
 
 

1964 births
Living people
Canadian male tennis players
Florida State Seminoles men's tennis players
20th-century Canadian people
21st-century Canadian people